The Château de La Fougeraie, also called the Château Wittouck, is a stately home in Belgium built in 1911 for the industrialist Paul Wittouck.

Location

The château is located in Uccle, on the outskirts of Brussels, in the Sonian Forest.

History

The château was built in 1911 for the industrialist Paul Wittouck (1851–1917) by the architect Louis Süe (1875–1968).
Paul Huillard (1875–1966) collaborated with Süe on the project.
The engineer was L. Bogaerts. Gustave Louis Jaulmes (1873–1959) decorated the interior.

During World War II (1939–45) the Belgian fascist leader Léon Degrelle occupied the chateau. In September–October 1944 Prince Bernhard of the Netherlands made it his base.
The Dutchman Christiaan Lindemans, known as King Kong due to his physique, had served the British secret service for four years before offering his services to the Germans. 
He was arrested at the Chateau Wittouck on 28 October 1944 on suspicion that he had betrayed the attack on Arnhem. 
The charge was almost certainly false.

Notes

Sources

External link

Castles in Belgium
Castles in Brussels
Chateau de La Fougeraie